The Sports Emmy Award for Outstanding Sports Personality, Play-by-Play was first awarded in 1993. It is awarded to whom the National Academy of Television Arts and Sciences judges to be the best play-by-play announcer in a calendar year.

Prior to 1993, an award was given in a category that awarded either a play-by-play announcer or studio host. See Outstanding Host or Commentator for a list of winners in the now-defunct category.

List of winners
1993: Dick Enberg (NBC)
1994: Keith Jackson (ABC)
1995: Al Michaels (ABC)
1996: Keith Jackson (2) (ABC)
1997: Bob Costas (NBC)
1998: Keith Jackson (3) (ABC)
1999: Keith Jackson (4) (ABC)
2000: Al Michaels (2) (ABC)
2001: Joe Buck (FOX)
2002: Joe Buck (2) (FOX)
2003: Joe Buck (3) (FOX)
2004: Joe Buck (4) (FOX)
2005: Joe Buck (5) (FOX)
2006: Al Michaels (3) (ABC/NBC)
2007: Al Michaels (4) (NBC)
2008: Jim Nantz (CBS)
2009: Jim Nantz (2) (CBS)
2010: Mike Emrick (NBC)
2011: Joe Buck (6) (FOX)
2012: Al Michaels (5) (NBC)
2013: Mike Emrick (2) (NBC)
2014: Mike Emrick (3) (NBC/NBCSN)
2015: Mike Emrick (4) (NBC/NBCSN)
2016: Mike Emrick (5) (NBC/NBCSN)
2017: Mike Emrick (6) (NBC/NBCSN)2018: Mike Emrick (7)  (NBC/NBCSN)
2019: Mike Emrick (8)  (NBC/NBCSN)
2020: Mike Emrick (9)  (NBC/NBCSN)
2021: Joe Buck (7) (FOX)
2022: Mike Breen''' (ABC/ESPN)

Awards established in 1993
1993 establishments in the United States
Play-by-Play